Hilston is a village in the East Riding of Yorkshire, England, near the North Sea coast in an area known as Holderness. It lies to the east of the B1242 road.

Governance
Hilston forms part of the civil parish of Roos and is represented locally by Roos Parish Council while at county level is in the South East Holderness ward of the East Riding of Yorkshire Council. At a parliamentary level it is part of the Beverley and Holderness constituency which is represented by Graham Stuart of the Conservative Party.

Landmarks

An octagonal tower, known as Admiral Storr's Tower, that was built in 1750 as a folly for John Storr and is designated a Grade II listed building and recorded in the National Heritage List for England, maintained by Historic England.

The Anglican church is dedicated to St Margaret and was built 1956–57 to designs by Francis Johnson to replace the church destroyed by a Second World War bomb in August 1941.

References

External links

Villages in the East Riding of Yorkshire
Holderness